The St. Lawrence Saints represented St. Lawrence University in ECAC women's ice hockey during the 2016–17 NCAA Division I women's ice hockey season. The Saints were among the best teams in the nation, finishing 2nd in the ECAC to National Champions and North Country rivals, Clarkson.

Recruiting

2016–17 Saints

2016-17 Schedule

|-
!colspan=12 style=";"| Regular Season

|-
!colspan=12 style=";"| ECAC Tournament

|-
!colspan=12 style=";"| NCAA Tournament

Awards and honors

 Kennedy Marchment, Forward, Patty Kazmaier Award Top 10 Finalist

 Brooke Webster, Forward, Patty Kazmaier Award Top 10 Finalist

Brooke Webster, 2016-17 AHCA-CCM Women's University Division I Second Team All-American 

 Kennedy Marchment, Forward, All-ECAC First Team

 Brooke Webster, Forward, All-ECAC First Team

 Grace Harrison, Goaltender, All-ECAC Second Team

 Hannah Miller, Forward, All-ECAC Second Team

 Kirsten Padalis, Defense, All-ECAC Second Team

References

St. Lawrence
St. Lawrence Saints women's ice hockey seasons
St. Lawrence Saints women's ice hockey
St. Lawrence Saints women's ice hockey